

Lake Ernani José Machado (Portuguese: Lago Ernani José Machado) is an artificial lake located in Lucas do Rio Verde, Brazil. Built in 2005, it has become one of the city's top tourist attractions. In its border it has a restaurant specialized in food with fish.

References

Lakes of Brazil
Geography of Mato Grosso
Lucas do Rio Verde